Glenda Raniece Proby (born December 1, 1987), better known by her stage names Gizzle and Lady G, is an American rapper and songwriter. Beginning her career as a ghostwriter for Lil' Fizz and Snoop Dogg in 2008, she has since collaborated with a number of prominent artists, particularly Puff Daddy and Ty Dolla Sign. She made her first appearance as a featured artist in 2015, on "You Can Be My Lover" from Puff Daddy's album MMM, and released her debut mixtape 7 Days in Atlanta in 2017. Her song “Go Up” is also the main Stadia song.

Early career 
From South Los Angeles, Proby showed a talent for writing from a young age, composing poetry and lengthy letters to her father when he was in jail. She started rapping as a teenager under the stage name Lady G Da Real Deal, regularly attending freestyle rap events in Los Angeles and San Bernardino county. She recorded a demo with Rhythm D of Ruthless Records and was offered a recording contract at the age of 17. However, she was encouraged by her manager, Cudda Love, to pursue songwriting for others instead.

In 2007, she gained her first writing credit on the Lil' Fizz track "Beds". She was then invited by producer Teddy Riley to write for Snoop Dogg's 2008 album Ego Trippin'. She is credited on the tracks "Gangsta Like Me" and "Can't Say Goodbye", both of which were regularly highlighted in positive reviews of the album.

Ghostwriting 
Since her early work with Riley and Snoop Dogg, Proby has become a prolific hip hop ghostwriter, working with prominent artists including Kanye West, Nicki Minaj, Meek Mill, Boosie Badazz, Kevin Gates, G-Eazy, Iggy Azalea, Trey Songz, Travis Scott and T.I. Two of her most frequent collaborators are Ty Dolla Sign, who she has worked with since 2008, and Puff Daddy (Sean Combs), whose albums MMM and No Way Out 2 she contributed to extensively.

Unusually for a female writer, Proby writes primarily for male rappers, but has been praised for successfully "getting inside the heads" of artists and working closely with them to compose songs that match their personal styles. She is also one of very few prominent queer women in the hip hop industry. Ty Dolla Sign has stated that this is an advantage in the often hypermasculine and hypersexualised world of hip hop, "you know she gets both sides ’cause Gizzle got bitches too!"

Solo career 
Proby began performing her own songs under the stage name Gizzle in 2011, posting several videos on her YouTube channel. In 2015, she was credited as a featured artist on "You Can Be My Lover" from Puff Daddy's album MMM. The following year, her appearance in the video for the track, as an unexpected "butch lesbian leading the song, rapping about hollering at women in the middle of a misogynistic smorgasbord," became a breakout performance for Gizzle. In 2016 she was featured on Australian singer-songwriter Delta Goodrem's single "Enough", taken from Goodrem's fifth studio album Wings of the Wild.

Gizzle released her debut mixtape, 7 Days in Atlanta, in January 2017. The EP was produced in a single, week-long trip to Atlanta, with one of seven songs being recorded each day. Gizzle plans to continue this concept with further 7 Days mixtapes recorded in other cities, including Los Angeles, Philadelphia and Denver. Revolt described the EP as "a serious reminder of why [Gizzle] is one of the best in the business."

Gizzle is working on a debut album, titled The Jump. She was featured on the Lupe Fiasco track "Jump", from Drogas Light, in 2017.

In 2021, Gizzle was featured on the soundtrack for the Netflix series Arcane on the track "Dynasties and Dystopia" alongside Denzel Curry and Bren Joy.

Singles

As featured artist

References

External links 
 Interview  with VICE News

Living people
Date of birth uncertain
Songwriters from California
American rappers
People from South Los Angeles
LGBT rappers
American LGBT singers
21st-century American rappers
1987 births